Pedro Martínez García (born 9 February 1996), commonly known as Pedrito is a Spanish footballer who plays for Košice as a midfielder.

Club career
Born in Dolores, Pedrito is a graduate of the Villarreal 's youth setup, after having joined the academy at the age of 12. In 2015, he was promoted to Villarreal C. On 25 October 2015, he made his debut for the reserves, coming as a 68th minute substitute for Fran Sol in a 1–0 defeat against Badalona.

On 18 November 2015, Pedrito injured his ligaments during a training session, and returned to play in December 2016, featuring in a league match for the C-team against Muro. On 7 December 2017, he made his first team debut for the senior team, coming on as a substitute for Roberto Soriano in a 1–0 defeat against Maccabi Tel Aviv in the UEFA Europa League.

On 18 January 2020, Pedrito joined Czech club Fastav Zlín on a contract until the summer 2022.

Club statistics

References

External links

1996 births
Living people
People from Vega Baja del Segura
Sportspeople from the Province of Alicante
Spanish footballers
Spanish expatriate footballers
Footballers from the Valencian Community
Association football midfielders
Segunda División B players
Tercera División players
Slovak Super Liga players
Czech First League players
2. Liga (Slovakia) players
Villarreal CF C players
Villarreal CF B players
UD Logroñés players
MFK Zemplín Michalovce players
FC Fastav Zlín players
FC Košice (2018) players
Spanish expatriate sportspeople in Slovakia
Spanish expatriate sportspeople in the Czech Republic
Expatriate footballers in Slovakia
Expatriate footballers in the Czech Republic